Amenohoakari (天火明命, Amenohoakari-no-mikoto) is a god of sun and agriculture in Japanese mythology. His descendants are called Tenson-zoku.

He is identified with the deity , ancestor of the Mononobe clan, who was among the first to recognize Jimmu as Emperor of Japan during Jimmu's Eastern Expedition.

Name 
Names for Amenohoakari are listed below.

 Amaterukuniteruhikoamenohoakarikushitamanigihayahi-no-mikoto (天照国照彦天火明櫛玉饒速日尊) in Kujiki
 Amaterukuniteruhikoamenohoakari-no-mikoto (天照國照彦天火明尊)
 Amaterukuniteruhikohoakari-no-mikoto (天照国照彦火明命) in Nihon Shoki
 Amenohoakari-no-mikoto (天火明命) in Kojiki
 Hoakari-no-mikoto (火明命) in Nihon Shoki
 Ikishiniho-no-mikoto (膽杵磯丹杵穂命)
 Amaterumitama-no-kami (天照御魂神) in Jinjyashiryō

Genealogy 
According to Kojiki and Nihon Shoki, Amenohoakari was born to Ame-no-oshihomimi and Takamimusubi's daughter, Yorozuhatahime. Ninigi-no-Mikoto is his younger brother, but in another book of Nihon Shoki Ninigi is his father.

In Harima-no-kuni Fudoki, Amenohoakari is the child of Ōkuninushi and Dotsuhime.

Descendants 
In Shinsen Shōjiroku, the descendants of Amatsuhikone, Ame-no-hohi, and Amanomichine, together with the descendants of Amenohoakari are referred to as Tenson-zoku. The Tenson-zoku descended from Takamagahara (Plain of High Heaven) to Owari and Tanba provinces, and are considered to be the ancestors of Owari, Tsumori, Amabe, and Tanba clans.

However, it is clear that Amabe-shi Keizu, which records these four clans as descendants of Amenohoakari, is a forged document, and that these clans actually descended from the sea deity Watatsumi. In addition, Owari clan's genealogy includes the great-grandson of Watatsumi, Takakuraji, as their ancestor, and this is considered to be the original genealogy.

The Mononobe clan is a clan whose ancestor was Nigihayahi. The Hozumi clan and the Kumano no Kunizukuri Wada clan are said to have the same ancestor. The Yuge clan is closely related to the Mononobe clan.

A genealogical tree handed down to the Kaifu clan, the family of the Kagome Shrine, has been designated a national treasure . .

Name meaning 
As Amenohoakari's name suggests, he is the deification of sunlight and heat. In Kojiki-den, Hoakari is written "穂赤熟", which means that the ears of rice ripen and become red. Like the other gods connected to the emperor, Amenohoakari's name is also related to rice and is worshiped as the sun god and the god of agriculture.

Tomb

The tomb of Nigihayahi-no-mikoto is located on Mount Shiraniwa in Shiraniwadai, Ikoma City, Nara Prefecture.

Shrines to worship 

 Iwafune Shrine - The shrine's deity is a huge rock called "Ame-no-Iwafune" (Heavenly Rock).
 Amateru Tamamikoto Shrine (Kyoto Prefecture Fukuchiyama City, Imaan)
 Ishikiri Kenjya Shrine (Osaka Higashi Osaka City Higashi Ishikiri-cho)
 Fujihaku Shrine (Wakayama Prefecture Kainan City)
 Hirose Taisha (Nara PrefectureKitakatsuragi CountyKawai Town)
 Yada-za Kushiyamahiko Shrine (Yada-cho, Yamatokoriyama City, Nara Prefecture)
 Flying Shrine - Founded in the Taisho era as a god of airplanes. Reihayakuninushi-no-mikoto is regarded as the ancestor god of aviation based on the old saying, "Riding on a celestial ship, flying through the sky," and is also worshipped as the god of the sky.
 Izeki-san Shrine - Amateru Shrine was founded in Emperor Sujin 2 (BC 96), enshrining a huge rocky platform as the sacred body of Amateru Kuniteruhiko Himyo Kushitama Reihatsu-no-mikoto.
 Kunitsuhikonomikoto Shrine (Ehime Prefecture Matsuyama City, Hachitanchi)
 Monobe Shrine (Shimane Prefecture Ota City, Kawai-cho)
 Karamatsusan Tenjingu Shrine (Akita Prefecture Daisen City Kyowa)
 In September of the 7th year of the reign of Emperor Sujin, the deity Amaterasu Kuniteruhikohikamyo Kushitama Neihatsuhikonomikoto was given the posthumous title of Amaterasu Omikami. Later, Emperor Keiko gave him the posthumous title of Amaterasu.

Masumida Shrine

 Masumida Shrine - One shrine in Owari Province. (The deity Amahimyo-no-mikoto is also called Amateru Kuniteruhiko Amahimyo-no-mikoto in the shrine tradition.
 Kago Shrine - The first shrine in Moto-Ise. (The deity Hikohimyo-no-mikoto is also known as Amateru Kuniteru Hikohimyo-no-mikoto, or Hotohotemikoto, according to the shrine tradition.

See Also 

 Jimmu's Eastern Expedition

Notes

References 

Japanese gods
Shinto kami
Agricultural gods
Solar gods